The Plunderers is a 1960 American Western film directed by Joseph Pevney and starring Jeff Chandler, John Saxon and Dolores Hart. It was nominated for a Golden Globe in 1960.

Plot
Unruly cowboys Rondo, Jeb, Mule and Davy ride into town. They can't pay for their drinks, so Sheriff McCauley jails them for a night. Then they refuse to pay clerk Ellie Walters at the general store, and take rooms at Kate Miller's hotel.

The rancher Sam Christy is asked for help. He is an American Civil War hero, but has lost the use of one arm and is tired of fighting. When the cowboys beat up the saloon keeper and McCauley is killed by Jeb, however, Sam offers to do what he can.

He is ambushed by the cowboys at the ranch, beaten and his horses stolen. Ellie tends to him and they kiss. In town, Davy is upset by what's happening and wants the cowboys to leave. Ellie is attacked by Rondo, who then comes at Sam with a knife. Ellie shoots him. Sam then kills Mule in a fight and shoots the fleeing Jeb. He allows the remorseful Davy to leave town.

Cast

 Jeff Chandler as Sam Christy
 John Saxon as Rondo
 Dolores Hart as Ellie Walters
 Marsha Hunt as Kate Miller – Hotel Owner
 Jay C. Flippen as Sheriff McCauley
 Ray Stricklyn as Jeb Lucas Tyler
 James Westerfield as Mike Baron – Saloon Owner
 Dee Pollock as Davy
 Roger Torrey as William 'Mule' Thompson 
 Vaughn Taylor as Jess Walters – General Store Owner
 Harvey Stephens as Doc Fuller
 Joseph Hamilton as Abilene – Barfly
 Kenneth Patterson as 2nd Citizen (as Ken Patterson)
 William Challee as 1st Citizen 
 Ray Ferrell as Bily Miller

Production
The film was made by August Productions for Allied Artists. August was a production company established by Jeff Chandler in association with writer Bob Barbash and publicist Jess Rand. Chandler described the film as "not a Western though the locale is the West." John Saxon had played many Mexican parts.

Filming started 12 May 1960.

Release
Steve Broidy of Allied Artists was so happy with the film he requested three more movies from August, only two of which Chandler had to appear in.

References

External links

1960 films
1960 Western (genre) films
Allied Artists films
American black-and-white films
American Western (genre) films
1960s English-language films
Films directed by Joseph Pevney
Films scored by Leonard Rosenman
Films set in Texas
1960s American films